Anıl Acar, (born 20 July 1988) better known by his stage name Gazapizm, is a Turkish rapper. He began making Turkish hip hop music in 2003, and in 2012 he founded Argo İzmir in Konak, İzmir. In 2014, he published the album Yeraltı Edebiyatı. He attracted attention with his street-like music compositions. In 2016, he released his second studio album Bir Gün Her Şey. He later recorded music videos for the songs "Gece Sabahın" and "Memleketsiz" in İzmir. His song "Heyecanı Yok" was featured on the soundtrack for the TV series Çukur. The song's release coincided with a period in which Turkish rap songs were more visible and used in the media and television. Later together with Cem Adrian, Gazapizm recorded the song "Kalbim Çukurda" for the same TV series.

Discography 
Albums
 Majör Depresyon (2009) 
 Yeraltı Edebiyatı (2014)
 Bir Gün Her Şey (2016)
 HİZA (2020)

EPs
 Karanfil (Live in İzmir) [feat. Tepecik Filarmoni Orkestrası] (2019)

Singles
 "Heyecanı Yok" (2017)
 "Kalbim Çukurda" (feat. Cem Adrian) (2018)
 "Ölüler Dirilerden Çalacak" (2018)
 "Alem - i Fani" (with Gripin; İyi Oyun Soundtrack) (2018)
 "Kaç İstersen" (2019)
 "Unutulacak Dünler" (2020)

Awards

References

External links 
 Fazla söze gerek yok: Gazapizm!, Hürriyet Campus: 18 March 2018.

Gazapizm on Spotify

Turkish rappers
Living people
21st-century Turkish singers
Turkish male singers
Golden Butterfly Award winners
1988 births